Laudakia cypriaca, also known as Cyprus rock agama, is a species of agamid lizard. It is endemic to Cyprus. It was originally described as a subspecies of Agama stellio (now Laudakia stellio). However, a 2022 revision of Laudakia stellio raised the former Laudakia stellio cypriaca to the full species rank, along with Laudakia vulgaris.

References

Laudakia
Lizards of Asia
Reptiles of Cyprus
Endemic fauna of Cyprus
Reptiles described in 1967